Ledebouria grandifolia is a species of flowering plant in the Asparagaceae family. It is endemic to Yemen.  Its natural habitats are subtropical or tropical dry forests and rocky areas.

Etymology 
Ledebouria is named for Carl Friedrich von Ledebour (1785-1851),  a botanist who published, among other things, the first complete Russian flora.

References

grandifolia
Endemic flora of Socotra
Least concern plants
Taxonomy articles created by Polbot
Taxa named by Isaac Bayley Balfour